Wesley Montgomery (December 11, 1859 – February 14, 1937) was an Ontario apple farmer and political figure. He represented Northumberland East in the Legislative Assembly of Ontario from 1919 to 1923 as a United Farmers of Ontario member.

He was born in Brighton Township, Canada West, the son of Cornelius Montgomery. Montgomery taught school for several years. In 1891, he married Gertrude Wade.

References 
 Canadian Parliamentary Guide, 1922, EJ Chambers

External links 

1859 births
1935 deaths
Canadian Methodists
United Farmers of Ontario MLAs
People from Northumberland County, Ontario
Farmers from Ontario